Justin Jules (born 20 September 1986) is a French professional road bicycle racer, who most recently rode for UCI ProTeam .

Personal life
Born in Sartrouville, he is the son of Pascal Jules, a professional cyclist who was active during the 1980s – achieving one Tour de France stage victory in 1984 – who died in a road traffic accident when Justin was just over a year old.

In 2008, Jules was sentenced to three years in prison for the manslaughter of his step-father in 2004. The sentence had been reduced due to a complicated upbringing and his step-father's troubles with alcoholism.

Career
Jules has competed as a professional since the start of the 2011 season, as the  team he had joined from the Vendée U-Pays de la Loire team, successfully became a Continental team. Jules achieved his first professional victory at the 2011 Tour of Hainan, when he won the first stage of the race, and held the overall race lead for a week. After a spell with the Véranda Rideau-Super U squad in 2012, Jules rejoined  for the 2013 season. In his first race since rejoining, Jules won a bunch sprint for the honours in the season-opening race of the 2013 UCI Europe Tour, the Grand Prix d'Ouverture La Marseillaise; he managed to hold off the advances of 's Samuel Dumoulin and  rider Thomas Damuseau, for victory.

Major results

2009
 5th Tour du Gâtinais
2010
 3rd Overall Circuit des Plages Vendéennes
1st Stage 7
 3rd GP Christian Fenioux
 4th Overall Saint Brieuc Agglo-Tour
2011
 1st Stage 1 Tour of Hainan
 5th Tour du Finistère
 8th Grand Prix de la ville de Nogent-sur-Oise
2012
 5th Overall Circuit des Plages Vendéennes
 8th Tour du Finistère
2013
 1st Grand Prix d'Ouverture La Marseillaise
 3rd Route Adélie
 5th Classic Loire Atlantique
 6th Val d'Ille Classic
 8th Overall Tour du Haut Var
 10th Tour of Nanjing
2014
 1st Stage 5 Tour d'Azerbaïdjan
 5th Overall Ronde de l'Oise
 10th Châteauroux Classic
2015
 1st Stage 1 Tour de Tunisie
 2nd Nokere Koerse
 4th Overall Tour de Gironde
 5th Overall Tour du Maroc
1st  Points classification
1st Stage 5
 6th Grand Prix de la ville de Nogent-sur-Oise
 6th Halle–Ingooigem
 7th Omloop van het Waasland
 10th Cholet-Pays de Loire
 10th Grand Prix Criquielion
2016
 1st Grote Prijs Stad Sint-Niklaas
 1st Stage 8 Tour du Maroc
 1st Stage 2 Tour de Tunisie
 5th Antwerpse Havenpijl
 5th UAE Cup
 7th Omloop Mandel-Leie-Schelde
 8th Memorial Van Coningsloo
 9th Gooikse Pijl
2017
 1st Stage 1 Circuit de la Sarthe
 2nd Tour de Vendée
 3rd Overall Tour de Normandie
1st Points classification
1st Stage 4
 3rd Grand Prix de la Ville de Lillers
 3rd Grote Prijs Jef Scherens
 4th Druivenkoers Overijse
 4th Paris–Bourges
 6th Paris–Troyes
 6th Grand Prix de Fourmies
 7th Overall Tour La Provence
1st Stage 1
2018
 3rd Overall Circuit de la Sarthe
1st Stage 1
 3rd Omloop Mandel-Leie-Schelde
 4th Grand Prix Criquielion
 5th Kuurne–Brussels–Kuurne
 6th Druivenkoers Overijse
 7th Overall Tour of Norway
 8th Overall Volta ao Alentejo
2019
 2nd Volta Limburg Classic
 5th Three Days of Bruges–De Panne
 6th Grand Prix de Denain
 7th Nokere Koerse
 9th Overall Vuelta a Aragón
1st  Points classification
1st Stage 1

References

External links
La Pomme Marseille profile

French male cyclists
1986 births
Living people
Sportspeople from Yvelines
People from Sartrouville
Cyclists from Île-de-France